HMS Saint Christopher (or St Christopher, or St Christopher's) was the French privateer Mohawk, launched in 1805, that the Royal Navy captured in 1806. The citizens of Saint Kitts (Saint Christopher Island), purchased her and donated her to the Royal Navy. She was broken up at Antigua in 1811.

Service
Mohawk was a French privateer launched in 1805 that the British captured on 17 March 1806. The citizens of Saint Christopher Island purchased her and presented her to the Navy,.

On 15 August 1806 Lieutenant John Tancock was promoted to Commander into Saint Christopher. He commissioned her that month in Antigua. He would remain her commander until late in 1808.

At some point, probably in December, Lieutenant Andrew Hodge took temporary command of St Christopher.

At daylight on 2 January 1807, Saint Christopher was under Hodge's command and about three miles off Saint Bartholomew's when she encountered and gave chase to three French privateers. They separated, with the result that she could only capture one. The prize turned out to be the sloop Entreprenante, of one small gun and seventeen men. The two other privateers escaped into Great Bay, St. Martin's.

Tancock had returned to command of Saint Christopher by 18 July when she captured the schooner Henrietta Adelaide, Lind, master. Then on 12 September St Christopher captured the schooner Julia and Sally, De Gasy, master. On 6 October St Christopher captured the Danish schooner Speculator.

The actual occupation of the Danish West Indies did not occur until 7 December, after receipt of news of the second battle of Copenhagen.

Late in 1808, a bad attack of yellow fever forced Tancock to return to Britain. A biography credited him with having captured several small Spanish vessels, detained a Danish ship that was condemned as a droit of admiralty, and recaptured a British vessel that had been carrying bale goods from Glasgow to St Thomas's.

Lieutenant Francis Alexander Halliday received promotion to Commander on 29 August 1808, and took command of St Christopher in September. He was her captain on 27 November when she captured Exchange.

In September 1809, Commander Smith replaced Halliday. However, Admiral Cochrane appointed Henry Nathaniel Rowe acting commander of St Christopher on 19 December; the appointment was confirmed in May 1810.

In May Rowe transferred to Asp, then under the command of Commander William M'Culloch. Rowe sailed Asp back to Britain with dispatches, and M'Culloch assumed command of St Christopher. On 18 February 1811 St Christopher captured the Spanish slave ship San Josef y Animas.{{efn|San Jose y Animas was a schooner owned by Ezequiel Madan, with Juan Villas y Apriera, master. She had left on her slaving voyage on 11 June 1810, gathered slaves at the Gambia, and had sailed from Africa on 9 August. After Saint Christopher captured her, San  Jose y Animas arrived at Antigua with 211 slaves. She was condemned there.

Fate
St Christopher was broken up at Antigua in 1811.

Notes, citations, and references
Notes

Citations

References

O’Byrne, William R. (1849) A naval biographical dictionary: comprising the life and services of every living officer in Her Majesty's navy, from the rank of admiral of the fleet to that of lieutenant, inclusive. (London: J. Murray).

1805 ships
Privateer ships of France
Captured ships
Sloops of the Royal Navy